Julia Anne Horsfield is a New Zealand biochemist and developmental geneticist. She is professor of pathology at the University of Otago and director of Genetics Otago and the Otago Zebrafish Facility.

Academic career 
Horsfield has a BSc from Victoria University of Wellington (1984–1988) and a PhD from the University of Otago (1992–1995). She moved to Australia as research fellow of the University of Adelaide (1996–1999), then returned to New Zealand as a research fellow at the University of Auckland (1999–2007). She joined the University of Otago in 2007 where she set up the Otago Zebrafish Facility to research cancer, stem cell biology and epigenetics. Her work focuses on the protein cohesin and its links to leukaemia.

Horsfield won a grant to research gout and how genetics affect the human body's control of uric acid.

In February 2019, Horsfield was awarded a Fulbright scholarship to extend her research "using single-cell sequencing to research how cell fate decisions are controlled in the zebrafish animal model" at University of California, Davis.

Horsfield was promoted to full professor at the University of Otago, effective 1 February 2020.

Selected works

References

External links 

 Profile of Professor Julia Horsfield, University of Otago

 

Living people
Year of birth missing (living people)
New Zealand women scientists
New Zealand women academics
New Zealand microbiologists
Victoria University of Wellington alumni
University of Otago alumni
Academic staff of the University of Otago